Ferenc Szálasi (6 January 1897 – 12 March 1946), the leader of the Arrow Cross Party – Hungarist Movement, became the "Leader of the Nation" (Nemzetvezető) as head of state and simultaneously prime minister of the Kingdom of Hungary's  "Government of National Unity" (Nemzeti Összefogás Kormánya) during the final six months of  Hungary's participation in World War II, after Germany occupied Hungary and removed the Regent (Admiral Miklós Horthy) by force in October 1944. During Szálasi's brief rule, his followers murdered 10,000–15,000 Jews. After the war, he was tried by a Hungarian court and sentenced to be executed for war crimes and for crimes against humanity committed during World War II.

Early life

Ancestry 
Born the son of a soldier in Kassa, Abaúj-Torna County, Kingdom of Hungary (now Košice, Slovakia) of mixed Armenian (the surname of his great-grandfather was Salossian), German, Hungarian (one grandparent), Slovak and Rusyn ancestry. His Armenian ancestors settled down in Ebesfalva, Transylvania during the reign of Prince Michael I Apafi. Szálasi's grandfather, who participated as a honvéd in the Hungarian Revolution of 1848, married a German woman from Vienna, and their son, Ferenc Szálasi, Sr. (born 1866) attended a military cadet school in Kassa and later became an official in the Honvédség. Szálasi's brothers, Béla, Károly and Rezső also served in the army.

Szálasi's mother was the Greek Catholic Erzsébet Szakmár (born 1875), who had Slovak and Rusyn roots. She provided religious education to her sons. Szálasi once said "I received the power of belief and faith in God through breast milk. My mother made to drink faith through and through me". Ferenc Szálasi lived with his mother until 1944.

Military career

Szálasi followed in his father's footsteps and joined the army at a young age. He finished elementary studies in his birthplace, then attended the military academy in Kőszeg, Marosvásárhely (now Târgu Mureș in Romania) and continued studies in Kismarton. Finally, he finished his military education in the Theresian Military Academy of Wiener Neustadt, where he was promoted to Lieutenant in 1915.

He eventually became an officer and served in the Austro-Hungarian Army during World War I. He served on the frontline for 36 months. At the end of the war, he was promoted to First Lieutenant and was involved in the 2nd regiment of k.u.k. Tyrolean Rifle Regiments, widely known as Kaiserjäger. He was stationed near Merano and Lake Garda in the Italian Front. Later the regiments were ordered to the north to Verdun at the last days of the war. For his service, he was honored with Third Class of the Order of the Iron Crown. Returning to Hungary, Szálasi performed courier service for the newly formed Ministry of Foreign Affairs after the Aster Revolution in November 1918.

Upon the dissolution and break-up of Austria-Hungary after the war, the Hungarian Democratic Republic and then the Hungarian Soviet Republic were briefly proclaimed in 1918 and 1919 respectively. The short-lived communist government of Béla Kun launched what was known as the "Red Terror" and ultimately involved Hungary in an ill-fated war with Romania.  In 1920, the country went into a period of civil conflict with Hungarian anti-communists and monarchists violently purging the nation of communists, leftist intellectuals, and others they felt threatened by, especially Jews. This period was known as the "White Terror" and, in 1920, after the pullout of the last of the Romanian occupation forces, it led to the restoration of the Kingdom of Hungary (Magyar Királyság) under Regent Miklós Horthy. During that time, Szálasi was still an apolitical person, and he did not involve himself in events beyond the general interest.

In 1920–21, Szálasi finished non-commissioned officer training school in Hajmáskér; following that, he served in the 13th Infantry Regiment in Miskolc. In 1923, he enrolled to the General Staff officers' training course at the Ludovica Military Academy. For his outstanding achievements, he was promoted with priority to Captain in 1924. In 1925, Szálasi entered the General Staff of the restored Kingdom. He fulfilled his mandatory field-grade task in 1929 at the 11th Infantry Regiment in Debrecen as a company commander. According to some memoirs by former subordinates, Szálasi was a popular and beloved superior among the infantry. His fellow officers acknowledged his military skills and literacy, but some others thought Szálasi was pedantic and autonomous. According to his future Minister of Defence, Károly Beregfy, "Szálasi's name among the General Staff was a concept of excellent hunting and tactics, but also a concept with the regards of honesty, truthfulness and Puritanism." By 1933, Szálasi had attained the rank of Major and became Chief of the 1st Honvéd Mixed-Brigade's General Staff in Budapest.

Political career

First steps in politics 
Around this time, when Gyula Gömbös came to power, Szálasi became fascinated with politics and often lectured on Hungary's political affairs. By this time, the hitherto apolitical Szálasi was a fanatical right-wing nationalist and a strong proponent of "Hungarism" and advocating the expansion of Hungary's territory back to the borders of Greater Hungary as it was prior to the Treaty of Trianon, which in 1920 had reduced the country's territory by 72%. In 1933, to summarize his views, he published his 46-page pamphlet with the title A magyar állam felépítésének terve ("Plan for the Building of the Hungarian State") and sent his work to several politicians. Soldiers and military officers were banned from politicizing, thus Szálasi was sentenced to twenty-day detention and expelled from the General Staff by a military court. After his release, Szálasi was ordered to the 14th Infantry Regiment in Eger, where served as staff officer then first adjutant. Szálasi gradually became disillusioned with the army and requested resignation from that in October 1934.

On 1 March 1935, Szálasi left the army in order to devote his full attention to politics, after which time he established the Party of National Will, a nationalistic group.
It was eventually outlawed by the conservative government for being too radical.  Unperturbed, Szálasi established the Hungarian National Socialist Party in 1937, which was also banned.  However, Szálasi was able to attract considerable support to his cause from factory workers and Hungary's lower classes by pandering to their aggrieved sense of nationalism and their virulent antisemitism.

After Germany's "Union" (Anschluss) with Austria in 1938, Szálasi's followers became more radical in their political activities, and Szálasi was arrested and imprisoned by the Hungarian Police.  However, even while in prison Szálasi managed to remain a powerful political figure, and was proclaimed leader of the National Socialist Arrow Cross Party (a coalition of several right-wing groups) when it was expanded in 1938.  The party attracted a large number of followers, and in the 1939 elections, it gained 30 seats in the Hungarian Parliament, thus becoming one of the more powerful parties in Hungary.  Freed due to a general amnesty resulting from the Second Vienna Award in 1940, Szálasi returned to politics.  When World War II began, the Arrow Cross Party was officially banned by Prime Minister Pál Teleki, thus forcing Szálasi to operate in secret.  During this period, Szálasi gained the support and backing of the Germans, who had previously been opposed to Szálasi because his Hungarist nationalism placed Hungarian territorial claims above those of Germany.

Way to power 
Following the Nazi occupation of Hungary in March 1944, the pro-German Döme Sztójay was installed as Prime Minister of Hungary. The Arrow Cross Party was then legalized by the government, allowing Szálasi to expand the party.  When Sztójay was deposed in August, Szálasi once again became an enemy of the Hungarian government and Regent Miklós Horthy ordered his arrest. By this time, Horthy realized that Hungary's position was untenable, and began putting out feelers to the Allies. The Germans were concerned that Horthy would succeed in extricating Hungary from the war. They had, however, waiting in the wings, a perfect ally in Szálasi.

When the Germans learned of the Regent's plan to come to a separate peace with the Soviets and exit the Axis alliance, they kidnapped Horthy's son, Miklós, Jr. and threatened to kill him unless Horthy abdicated in favor of Szálasi.  Under duress, Horthy signed a document announcing his own abdication and naming Szálasi prime minister–effectively giving "legal sanction" to an Arrow Cross coup. In his memoirs, Horthy contended the appointment of Szálasi was invalid, saying, "A signature wrung from a man at machine-gun point can have little legality." The Germans then pressured Parliament to install Szálasi as Head of State as well.

National leader 

Szálasi's Government of National Unity turned the Kingdom of Hungary into a puppet state of Nazi Germany formed on 16 October 1944 after Regent of Hungary Miklós Horthy was removed from power during Operation Panzerfaust (Unternehmen Eisenfaust) .

The Hungarian parliament approved the formation of a Council of Regency (Kormányzótanács) of three. On 4 November, Szálasi was sworn as Leader of the Nation (nemzetvezető). He formed a government of sixteen ministers, half of which were members of the Arrow Cross Party. While the Horthy regency had come to an end, the Hungarian monarchy was not abolished by the Szálasi regime, as government newspapers kept referring to the country as the Kingdom of Hungary (Magyar Királyság, also abbreviated as m.kir.), although Magyarország (Hungary) was frequently used as an alternative.

Szálasi and his "Quisling government" had little other intention or ability but to execute the party's ideology and to maintain control in Nazi-occupied portions of Hungary as the Soviet Union invaded. He did this in order to reduce the threat to Germany. Szálasi's aim was to create a one-party state based on Hungarism.

Under his rule as a close ally of Germany, the Germans, with the assistance of the Szálasi government, recommenced the deportation of the Jews, which had been suspended by Horthy. He organised the so-called International Ghetto. During that time some diplomats like Raoul Wallenberg gave protective passports to some Jews, which protected them from deportation. Germans argued they weren't valid according to international law, but Szálasi's government accepted them nevertheless. His government promoted martial law and courts-martial, and executed those who were considered dangerous for the state and the continuation of the war. During Szálasi's rule, Hungarian tangible assets (cattle, machinery, wagons, industrial raw material etc.) were sent to Germany. He conscripted young and old into the remaining Hungarian Army and sent them into hopeless battles against the Red Army.

Szálasi's rule only lasted 163 days, partly because by the time he took power, the Red Army was already deep inside Hungary. For all intents and purposes, his authority was limited to a narrowing band in the centre of the country, including Budapest. On 19 November 1944, Szálasi was in the Hungarian capital when Soviet and Romanian forces began encircling it.  By the time the city was encircled and the 102-day Siege of Budapest began, he was gone.  The "Leader of the Nation" (Nemzetvezető) fled to Szombathely on 9 December. By March 1945, Szálasi was in Vienna just prior to the Vienna Offensive.  Later, he fled to Munich.

Trial and execution 
The Arrow Cross Party's cabinet, which had fled Hungary, was dissolved on 7 May 1945, a day before Germany's surrender. Szálasi was captured by American troops in Mattsee on 6 May and returned to Hungary on 3 October. He was tried by the People's Tribunal in Budapest in open sessions begun in February 1946, and sentenced to death for war crimes and high treason.

Szálasi was hanged on 12 March 1946 in Budapest, along with two of his former ministers, Gábor Vajna and Károly Beregfy, and the party ideologist József Gera. The hanging was conducted in the Austrian pole method. A large post had a rope attached to a hook at the top. Szálasi was marched up steps, placed with his back to the post, his legs and arms were tied, the noose placed around his neck, the rope tightened, and the steps were removed. With the post only leaving a couple feet between Szálasi and the ground it is likely that he died slowly due to strangulation rather than being instantaneously rendered unconscious and dying shortly after as would happen when utilizing the standard drop. This would also explain why his arms and legs were bound as to prevent struggle during the process.

Thirty-two photos of the hanging were donated to the United States Holocaust Memorial Museum. Other photographs of the execution are on display in the Holocaust Room of the Budapest Jewish Museum.

On 13 March 1946, the day after Szálasi's death, the National Council of People's Tribunals discussed the convicted politicians' plea for mercy and recommended its refusal to Justice Minister István Ries, when Szálasi and his ministers were already executed. Ries forwarded the decision to President Zoltán Tildy, who subsequently approved the death sentence and execution on 15 March 1946.

Szálasi was buried in Rákoskeresztúr New Public Cemetery in the Budapest Capital District, Budapest, Hungary, plot 298. In 2008, historian Tamás Kovács claimed the Political Department of the Hungarian State Police (PRO; predecessor of the feared secret police State Protection Authority) falsified his name and birth certificate, and buried him as "Ferenc Lukács" in section 298 of the New Public Cemetery. Other historians, however, rejected this claim, since no written source could be found.

See also 
Cluj Ghetto
Hungarian Turanism

References

Sources and further reading
 Cohen, Asher. "Some Socio-Political Aspects of the Arrow Cross Party in Hungary." East European Quarterly 21.3 (1987): 369+
 Deak, Istvan. "Collaborationism in Europe, 1940–1945: The Case of Hungary." Austrian History Yearbook 15 (1979): 157–164.
 Deák, István. "A fatal compromise? The debate over collaboration and resistance in Hungary." East European Politics and Societies 9.2 (1995): 209–233.
 Deák, István.  “Hungary”  in Hans Rogger and Egon Weber, eds., The European Right: A Historical Profile (1963) pp. 364–407. 
 Herczl, Moshe Y. Christianity and the Holocaust of Hungarian Jewry (1993) pp 79–170. online
 Lackó, M. Arrow-Cross Men: National Socialists 1935–1944 (Budapest, Akadémiai Kiadó 1969).
Fiala-Marschalkó: Vádló bitófák. London: Süli, 1958

External links
 

1897 births
1946 deaths
Politicians from Košice
Austro-Hungarian military personnel of World War I
Hungarians in Slovakia
Hungarian Roman Catholics
Arrow Cross Party politicians
Prime Ministers of Hungary
Education ministers of Hungary
Christian fascists
Heads of government convicted of war crimes
Heads of state convicted of war crimes
Holocaust perpetrators in Hungary
Hungarian Nazis
Hungarian nationalists
Hungarian people convicted of war crimes
Hungarian people of Armenian descent
Hungarian people of German descent
Hungarian people of Slovak descent
Hungarian people of World War II
People executed by Hungary by hanging
World War II political leaders
Leaders who took power by coup
Romani genocide perpetrators
Executed Hungarian collaborators with Nazi Germany
Executed prime ministers
People executed for war crimes
Hungarian politicians convicted of crimes
Hungarian anti-communists
Heads of government who were later imprisoned
Theresian Military Academy alumni
Prisoners and detainees of the United States military